Oriava  is a village (selo) in Stryi Raion, Lviv Oblast, of  Western Ukraine. Village Oriava is located in the Ukrainian Carpathians, within the limits of the Eastern Beskids ( Skole Beskids ) in southern Lviv Oblast. It belongs to Kozova rural hromada, one of the hromadas of Ukraine. The village is located along the river with the same name Oriava.
Local government– Oriavska village council.

The first mention of Oriava dates from 1574.

Until 18 July 2020, Oriava belonged to Skole Raion. The raion was abolished in July 2020 as part of the administrative reform of Ukraine, which reduced the number of raions of Lviv Oblast to seven. The area of Skole Raion was merged into Stryi Raion.

Attractions 

The village has an architectural monument of local importance of Skole Raion  (Skole district).
 Church of the Nativity Blessed Virgin Mary (wood) 1882 (the previous name - Church of St. Arch. Michael).

References

External links 
 Населенні пункти Сколівського району  -  Орява 
 Сколівщина.-Львів.1996 
 weather.in.ua

Villages in Stryi Raion